Sergei Viktorovich Narylkov (born 7 October 1987) is a Russian professional football player. He plays for FC Irtysh Omsk.

Club career
He made his Russian Football National League debut for FC Dynamo Barnaul on 27 March 2008 in a game against FC Ural Yekaterinburg.

Honours
 Russian Professional Football League Zone East best player, top scorer: 2016–17.

References

External links
 
 

1987 births
People from Chernogorsk
Sportspeople from Khakassia
Living people
Russian footballers
Association football midfielders
FC Dynamo Barnaul players
FC Shinnik Yaroslavl players
FC Baikal Irkutsk players
FC Novokuznetsk players
FC Chita players
FC Irtysh Omsk players
Russian First League players
Russian Second League players